Brent Gibson is a New Zealand para-swimmer. At the 1988 Summer Paralympics, he won a gold medal in the 200m Freestyle 3, and bronze medals in the 100m Individual Medley 3 and 50m Freestyle 3.

References

External links 
 
 

Living people
Year of birth missing (living people)
Paralympic swimmers of New Zealand
Swimmers at the 1988 Summer Paralympics
Paralympic gold medalists for New Zealand
Paralympic bronze medalists for New Zealand
Medalists at the 1988 Summer Paralympics
Paralympic medalists in swimming
New Zealand male freestyle swimmers
20th-century New Zealand people